The Highland School is a democratic school for day and boarding students in Ellenboro, West Virginia, United States. It was founded in 1981 by Charlotte and Steve Landvoigt. The school was inspired by the Summerhill School in Suffolk, England and is similar to the Sudbury model of democratic schooling. Its boarding program is a unique feature in the United States.

The Highland School has hosted students from all over the world including Japan, France, Germany, Switzerland and the Philippines. International students interact with day students from central West Virginia and boarding students from other regions of the United States.

See also
List of democratic schools
List of Sudbury schools

References

External links 
 

Democratic education
Boarding schools in West Virginia
Ritchie County, West Virginia
Private high schools in West Virginia
Sudbury Schools
Educational institutions established in 1981
1981 establishments in West Virginia